The Tasmania Combined XI was a representative cricket team raised intermittently between 1937 and 1979. The team, comprising state cricketers and select players from the Australian national side, played against touring international sides. Matches were played in Hobart, Launceston and Devonport. In total, sixteen first-class matches were played.

First-class fixtures

See also
 Western Australia Combined XI

References

Australian first-class cricket teams